Robinson Crusoe is a 1947 Soviet adventure 3-D film.

Plot
The story of the film is based on the 1719 novel Robinson Crusoe by Daniel Defoe.

Cast
 Pavel Kadochnikov - Robinson Crusoe
 Yuri Lyubimov - Friday
 Aleksandr Smiranin - Father of Robinson
 E. Sanikidze - Mother of Robinson
 V. Pavlenko - Liza

Background
The film is the first glasses-free stereoscopic feature film, the first Soviet 3-D feature film.

Sergei Eisenstein wrote about the film and its use of 3-D in 1948: "Will the cinema of the future be stereoscopic? Will tomorrow follow today?" and further: "Mankind has for centuries been moving toward stereoscopic cinema... The bourgeois West is either indifferent or even hostilely ironical toward the problems of stereoscopic cinema.".

References

External links

1947 films
1940s adventure drama films
1940s 3D films
Films based on Robinson Crusoe
1940s Russian-language films
Soviet adventure drama films
Soviet black-and-white films
1947 drama films
Soviet 3D films